Xələc (also, Xalac, Khaladzh, Khaladzh Pervyy, and Khaladzh Vtoroy) is a village and municipality in the Ujar Rayon of Azerbaijan.  It has a population of 853.

References 

Populated places in Ujar District